CK, Ck, or ck may refer to:

Science and technology
 Conductive keratoplasty, a type of refractive surgery
 Creatine kinase, an enzyme
 Cytokinin, a plant hormone
 Cytokeratin (CK1 to CK20), keratin proteins
 Cyanogen chloride, an inorganic chemical

Computing
 .ck, the Internet country code top-level domain for the Cook Islands
 Collective Knowledge (software), a framework for collaborative and reproducible research

Organizations
 Calvin Klein, a fashion company
 Chowking, a Filipino fast food chain
 Colombo Kings, a team participating in Lanka Premier League
 CK Hutchison Holdings, a multinational conglomerate headquartered in Hong Kong
 Bloods, a US-based street gang, from the nickname "Crip Killer"
Circle K, an international chain of convenience stores

Transportation
 China Cargo Airlines (IATA code CK)
 Composite Corridor, a designation of British Rail carriages
 Chevrolet C/K, a model of pickup truck

People
 Louis C.K. (born 1967), American comedian
 Con Kolivas, Australian anaesthetist

Other uses
 ck (digraph), a letter combination used in spelling
 C-K theory (concept-knowledge theory), in design
 CK (album), a 1988 album by Chaka Khan
 Civilinis kodeksas, the Code of Lithuania
 Core Knowledge, a textbook series
 Cranbrook Kingswood, a school in the US

See also 
 CAK (disambiguation)
 KC (disambiguation)